Home is the fifth album by Caspar Brötzmann Massaker, released in January 1995 through Our Choice.

Track listing

Personnel 
Musicians
Caspar Brötzmann – guitar, vocals, production, cover art
Eduardo Delgado-Lopez – bass guitar, vocals
Danny Arnold Lommen – drums
Production and additional personnel
Dirk Rudolph – cover art
F.M. Einheit – production
Bruno Gebhard – production

References

External links 
 

1995 albums
Caspar Brötzmann albums